Anticrates crocophaea is a moth of the  family Lacturidae. It is known from South Africa.

References

Endemic moths of South Africa
Zygaenoidea
Moths of Africa